The Wagendrift Dam is a multi-arch type dam located on the Bushman's River, upstream of Estcourt, in the KwaZulu-Natal province of South Africa. It was completed in 1963 and serves mainly for irrigation purposes, domestic water supply and industrial demands. The hazard potential of the dam has been ranked high (3).

See also
List of reservoirs and dams in South Africa

References 

 List of South African Dams from the Department of Water Affairs

Dams in South Africa
Dams completed in 1963